Tsuniah Lake Lodge Airport  is located adjacent to Tsuniah Lake Lodge, British Columbia, Canada.

References

Registered aerodromes in British Columbia
Cariboo